Jiao Huafeng (born 1981-09-24 in Shandong) is a male Chinese Greco-Roman wrestler who competed at the 2008 Summer Olympics.

Among his achievements, Huafeng's personal best was coming in 1st Place at the 2006 Asian Games.

References
 profile

1981 births
Living people
Olympic wrestlers of China
Chinese male sport wrestlers
Sportspeople from Shandong
Wrestlers at the 2008 Summer Olympics
Asian Games medalists in wrestling
Wrestlers at the 2006 Asian Games
Medalists at the 2006 Asian Games
Asian Games gold medalists for China
20th-century Chinese people
21st-century Chinese people